Meghna Singh (born 18 June 1994) is an Indian cricketer who plays for Railways. In August 2021, Singh earned her maiden call-up to the India women's cricket team, for their series against Australia, including being named in India's squad for the one-off women's Test match. She made her Women's One Day International (WODI) debut on 21 September 2021, for India against Australia. She made her Test debut on 30 September 2021, also for India against Australia.

In January 2022, she was named in India's team for the 2022 Women's Cricket World Cup in New Zealand. She was also named in India's Women's Twenty20 International (WT20I) squad for their one-off match against New Zealand.

In July 2022, she was named in India's team for the cricket tournament at the 2022 Commonwealth Games in Birmingham, England. She made her WT20I debut on 29 July 2022, for India against Australia in the opening match of the Commonwealth Games cricket tournament.

References

External links
 
 

1994 births
Living people
People from Bijnor
Cricketers from Uttar Pradesh
Indian women cricketers
India women Test cricketers
India women One Day International cricketers
India women Twenty20 International cricketers
Uttar Pradesh women cricketers
Railways women cricketers
Central Zone women cricketers
IPL Velocity cricketers
IPL Supernovas cricketers
Cricketers at the 2022 Commonwealth Games
Commonwealth Games silver medallists for India
Commonwealth Games medallists in cricket
Medallists at the 2022 Commonwealth Games